Salt Run is a stream in Noble County, Ohio.

Salt Run was historically known for its salt production industry.

See also
List of rivers of Ohio

References

Rivers of Noble County, Ohio
Rivers of Ohio